La Push is a small unincorporated community situated at the mouth of the Quillayute River in Clallam County, Washington, United States, in the western Olympic Peninsula. La Push is the largest community within the Quileute Indian Reservation, which is home to the federally recognized Quileute tribe. La Push is known for its whale-watching and natural environment. The community has historically been located on the coast, however sea level rise led the community to begin managed retreat to higher grounds in 2017.

Geography 
The name La Push is from French La Bouche, meaning "The Mouth" of the Quillayute River, adapted into Chinook Jargon. Two beaches are nearby: Rialto Beach to the north of the river mouth and La Push Beach to the south.

La Push has the westernmost ZIP Code in the contiguous United States, 98350.

Climate
La Push has a very wet oceanic climate. The climate is moderated and strongly influenced by the Pacific Ocean, which renders mild winters for a northerly latitude. Located to the west of the Olympic Mountains, La Push and the surrounding coastline absorb considerable rainfall dropped along the mountain front. The warmest month is August and the coolest month is December.

History 
La Push, 14 miles from Forks, is home to the Quileute Tribe. Tribal members traditionally built cedar canoes for a variety of uses; they ranged in size from two-man to ocean-going freight vessels capable of carrying three tons. The Quileute ranked second only to the Makah as whalers, and first among all the tribes as seal hunters. They bred special woolly-haired dogs, and spun and wove their hair into prized warm blankets. According to the stories, the Quileutes' only kin, the Chimakum, were separated from them by a great flood that swept them to the Quimper Peninsula on the other side of the North Olympic Peninsula. There they were attacked and destroyed in the 1860s by Chief Seattle and the Suquamish Tribe.

The first treaty with European Americans occurred in 1855, when the Quileutes signed a treaty with representatives of Territorial Governor Isaac Stevens. A treaty a year later would have moved them to a reservation in Taholah, but the Quileute territory was so remote that it was not enforced. In February 1889, an executive order by President Grover Cleveland established a one-mile square reservation at La Push. At the time the town had 252 inhabitants. Later in 1889, arsonists destroyed La Push while villagers were picking hops in Puyallup.

Work began in 2017 to relocate the village to higher ground. The plan was to reduce damage from tsunamis and flooding that might result from a higher sea level caused by climate change. The plan required modification of the boundaries of the Olympic National Park. The first building that was moved was the elementary school.

Tourism 

Today, La Push has oceanfront resorts, a seafood company, fish hatchery, and a revamped marina. Since the early 21st century, the tribe has grown more interested in tourism. La Push is a village of the Quileute Tribe that displays a slower, more relaxed way of life. All of the businesses are owned by the tribe. The Quileute Tribe has revived many of its traditional skills and crafts, which are taught at school along with the unique language. It is an isolate language, unrelated to any root language in the world, and one of only five in the world without nasal sounds.

The popular Quileute Days take place July 17–19 in La Push. The tribal celebration of cultural heritage and modern lifestyle includes a fireworks display, a traditional salmon bake, dancing and songs, a softball tournament, and other field sports, a slow-pitch tournament, a horseshoe tournament, arts and craft display, and food concessions.

The Pacific Northwest National Scenic Trail passes through La Push on the way to its western terminus at Cape Alava.

Education
La Push is the location of the Quileute Tribal School.

References

External links
 Olympic Peninsula, Washington State: Things To Do Around La Push

Unincorporated communities in Washington (state)
Unincorporated communities in Clallam County, Washington
Chinook Jargon place names
Quileute
Populated coastal places in Washington (state)
Managed retreat